CFBC (930 kHz) is a commercial Canadian radio station in Saint John, New Brunswick. The station plays a country format and is owned & operated by the Maritime Broadcasting System.

CFBC broadcasts with a power output of 2,000 watts daytime and 150 watts nighttime non-directional as of January 2020. CFBC previously broadcast at a maximum 50,000 watts using a 4-tower directional array to protect other stations on AM 930. The ownership applied for and received approval in January 2020 to lower the station’s power, with the licensee stating the change was required to address system failures, repairs, the ever-increasing costs of operating an AM radio station, and a steady decline in the station's revenues. CFBC's transmitter, a former four-tower array, is located off Sand Cove Road in Saint John.

History

CFBC's first broadcast was on November 21, 1946, and was an affiliate of the CBC Dominion Network until its dissolution in 1962. The call sign comes from the station's original owner, the Fundy Broadcasting Company (later known as Fundy Cable).

In 1965, an FM station was added. CFBC-FM began operating at 98.9 MHz. It is now known as CJYC-FM. MBS purchased CFBC and CJYC from Fundy in 1997.

For several years, the studios and offices for CFBC and sister station CJYC-FM, were on Carleton Street in Uptown Saint John. In the mid-1990s, CFBC and CJYC-FM moved their studios and offices to 199 Chesley Drive. In 1997, CFBC and CJYC-FM moved into MBS's facility on Union Street.

In addition to its music, CFBC is known for its news coverage. A morning talk show, Talk of the Town, was discontinued in 2006.

Unionized staff at CFBC and two other MBS stations in Saint John went on strike in June 2012, triggering calls for a boycott of the station's advertisers.  The strikers set up an internet radio station until the strike was settled.

In August 2013, CFBC flipped from oldies/classic hits to country.

Notable alumni
CFBC has been home to several notable people in radio and television. They include:

 Bob Lockhart
 Clark Todd (deceased)
 Ron Wilson (deceased)

References

External links
93 CFBC
MBS Radio Station Guide - CFBC
 

Fbc
Fbc
Fbc
Radio stations established in 1946
1946 establishments in New Brunswick
FBC